Ajmone-Marsan is a surname, and can refer to:

Members of the Ajmone-Marsan family of Italy, including:
Marco Ajmone-Marsan (1859–1918), Italian entrepreneur 
Alessandro Ajmone-Marsan (1884–1941), Italian footballer, elder son of Marco
Noemi Ajmone-Marsan (1886-1967), only daughter of Marco
Annibale Ajmone-Marsan (1888-1956), Italian footballer, 2nd son of Marco
Veniero Ajmone-Marsan (1918-2007), Italian economist, son of Annibale
Riccardo Ajmone-Marsan (1889-1958), Italian footballer, 3rd son of Marco
Giorgio Ajmone-Marsan (1926-2008), Italian entrepreneur and owner of Magazzini Generali Piemontesi, son of Riccardo
Giulia Ajmone-Marsan (1955), Italian journalist and historian, only daughter of Giorgio and daughter of Umberta Nasi

Italian-language surnames
Compound surnames